"Set Your Heart" is a song written and produced by Cyndi Lauper and Richard Morel for Lauper's 2008 album Bring Ya to the Brink. The song was released in early 2008 as a promo-only single in Japan, where it received considerable airplay.

The track features an interpolation of "Where Are All My Friends" written by Gene McFadden, John Whitehead and Victor Carstarphen. "Where Are All My Friends" was a hit single for Harold Melvin & the Blue Notes and first appeared on their 1975 album To Be True. Cyndi Lauper performed the song frequently during the True Colors Tour 2007 with live drums and brass.

"Girls Just Wanna Set Your Heart"
"Girls Just Wanna Set Your Heart" is a mashup of "Girls Just Want to Have Fun" and "Set Your Heart", released as a single from Floor Remixes. It was released in Japan on January 21, 2009 as a CD single (with 2008 printed on it) and as a digital download. Karl Giant directed the music video.

Charts

References

Cyndi Lauper songs
Songs written by Gene McFadden
Songs written by Cyndi Lauper
Songs written by John Whitehead (singer)